The Continuing Saga of the Ageing Orphans is a 1979 compilation album by the rock group Thin Lizzy.

Despite ostensibly featuring a selection of songs from the band's first three albums and their rare New Day EP, most of the tracks are in fact different from the originally released versions, having been remixed and altered with newly recorded material specially for this release during Christmas 1977. Of the 11 tracks, only "Mama Nature Said", "The Hero and the Madman" and "Vagabond of the Western World" (all from Vagabonds of the Western World) are the same as their original album counterparts. Midge Ure (of Ultravox) and Gary Moore feature on some of the newly recorded songs. Despite the album's name, it does not include the track "Saga of the Ageing Orphan" from the band's first album.

The album has long been out of print, but all of the altered tracks were re-released as bonus tracks on the 2010 remastered versions of Thin Lizzy, Shades of a Blue Orphanage and Vagabonds of the Western World.

Track listing

Singles
 Things Ain't Working Out Down At The Farm/The Rocker/Little Darling – 7" EP (1979)

Personnel
Thin Lizzy
Phil Lynott – bass guitar, vocals, acoustic guitar, keyboards
Eric Bell – guitars
Brian Downey – drums, percussion
Gary Moore – guitars (tracks 1-3, 5, 8-10), vocals (track 10), keyboards (tracks 1, 5, 8-9)

Additional musicians
Midge Ure – guitar, vocals (tracks 1, 9)
Kid Jensen – narrator on track 7
Clodagh Simonds – piano on track 3

Recordings
According to the sleeve notes, "All the tracks were originally recorded between the years 1971–1973. Remixes and alterations were recorded at No. 2 Studio, Decca West Hampstead, Christmas '77." The engineers are listed as Derek Varnals, Martin Haskell, Peter Rynston, Louie Austin and David Grinstead.

References

1978 compilation albums
Thin Lizzy compilation albums
Decca Records compilation albums